Megachile pusilla is a species of bee in the family Megachilidae. It was described by Pérez in 1884.

References

Pusilla
Insects described in 1884